Gardiquimod  is an experimental drug which acts selectively at both mouse and human forms of toll-like receptor 7 (TLR7). It functions as an immune response modifier. The core structure is 1H-imidazo[4,5-c]quinoline, as found in related drugs such as imiquimod and resiquimod. It is structurally very similar to resiquimod differing only by an oxygen for nitrogen switch.

References 

Antineoplastic and immunomodulating drugs
Imidazoquinolines
Tertiary alcohols
Experimental drugs